Life Study is a 1973 romance film of young Italian-American boy Angelo and a rich, eccentric, lonely girl Myrna. The film stars are Bartholomew Miro Jr. as Angelo, Erika Peterson as Myrna and Tommy Lee Jones as Gus, directed by Michael Nebbia (Alice's Restaurant).  It is Nebbia's directorial debut.

Cast 
 Bartholomew Miro Jr. as Angelo Corelli
 Erika Peterson as Myrna Clement
 Gregory D'Alessio as Adrian Clement
 Tommy Lee Jones as Gus
 Rosetta Garuffi as Grandma
 Anthony Forest as John Clement
 Yvonne Sherwell as Peggy Clement
 Ed Mona as Vinnie

Production
Principal photography took place during June 1970 in Middletown, New York, Denbo, Pennsylvania and Pittsburgh.

Home media
The film has never been released on video.

See also
 List of American films of 1973

References

External links
 
 NYT Movie Review

1973 films
1973 romantic drama films
American romantic drama films
Films shot in Pennsylvania
Films shot in New York (state)
1973 directorial debut films
1970s English-language films
1970s American films